Anne Arundel Hopkins Aitken (February 8, 1911 – June 13, 1994) was an American   Zen Buddhist, in the Harada-Yasutani lineage. She co-founded the Honolulu Diamond Sangha in 1959 together with her husband, Robert Baker Aitken. 
She purchased both of its properties: the Koko An Zendo and Maui Zendo.
Honolulu Diamond Sangha has been considered "one of several pivotal Buddhist organizations critical to the development of Zen" in western countries.
Anne Aitken was also one of the original founders of the Buddhist Peace Fellowship.

Early life
Anne Hopkins was born on February 8, 1911, to in Cook County, Illinois.  Her mother, Marian Stinchfield Hopkins, was born in Detroit, Michigan, and was 25 when Anne was born. Her father, Lambert Arundel Hopkins, born in New Mexico, was a 29-year-old "railroad supply man" when she was born.

Named Anna Stinchfield Hopkins on her birth certificate, No.6407, Hopkins told her husband, Robert Baker Aitken, that her name was later changed (when she was old enough to remember the event, perhaps six to eight years-old) because Stinchfield did not provide positive numerology readings.

Education
Hopkins spent the years 1929 to 1931 studying abroad as an undergraduate at Oxford University and graduated from Scripps College in Claremont, California, with a B.A. in English in 1932. She then pursued a master's degree in sociology, first at Stanford University in 1933, and later at Northwestern University (1940–1942). In addition to her Oxford years, she also lived in England from January to June, 1937. She traveled to Sweden, Finland, France, Germany, Spain, Japan, Italy, México, and much of South America 
Among other experiences, she had worked in a settlement house in Chicago.  During World War II, she worked in a Red Cross hospital.

In 1949, Hopkins became a teacher and assistant director at Happy Valley School. There she met, hired, and in 1957 married, English teacher Robert Aitken.

Zen Buddhism

Her new husband introduced her to Zen Buddhism, and her long relationship with the Buddhist community began with their honeymoon to Ryutakuji in Japan. She went on to study the Dharma with Haku'un Yasutani, Sōen Nakagawa and Koun Yamada. She was given the Japanese Buddhist name An (Peace, peace of being at home)  Tanshin (Single mind). She and her husband moved to Honolulu, Hawaii, to be closer to her young stepson, Thomas L. Aitken. 

There they established the Koko An Zendo, which led to the establishment of the Diamond Sangha, an international Zen Buddhist society, in 1959. A second site, Maui Zendo in Haiku, Maui, was established by the Aitkens in 1969. Both Koko An Zendo and Maui Zendo were purchased by Anne Aitken, using money from an inheritance. 

Her essay In Spite of Myself chronicled some of her early experiences, and the discouragement and disillusion that she experienced during the twelve years of practice that led to her realization of kensho. 
Many of the changes that emphasized the full equality of women and made Zen practice and leadership more accessible to women can be attributed to her work within the Diamond Sangha. She was neither a prolific writer nor a frequent speaker, but she is remembered fondly around the world for her dedication to the Dharma and support for the Sangha. People recall how she touched them individually and made each one feel as if they were special to her.

Aitken was living at the teacher's quarters of the Honolulu Diamond Sangha in Pālolo, Hawaii, when she became ill, displaying symptoms similar to the flu. Two days later, on June 13, 1994, at the age of 83, she died of a coronary heart attack,  with her husband, stepson, and some close friends at her hospital bedside.

Gallery

Suggested readings
  Reprinted in Blind Donkey. 15 (1 Spring, 1995): 5-7, 12.
 Aitken, Robert.1982. "Willy-Nilly Zen." pp. 115–132. In:

See also
Timeline of Zen Buddhism in the United States

References

External links
 
 
 

1911 births
1994 deaths
American Zen Buddhists
American Buddhists
Alumni of the University of Oxford
Converts to Buddhism
Northwestern University alumni
Stanford University School of Humanities and Sciences alumni
Scripps College alumni
Female Buddhist spiritual teachers